Nandana Varma is an Indian actress who predominantly appears in Malayalam cinema.

Film career
Nandana made her movie debut through a minor role in Spirit. Then she went on to act minor supporting roles in Ayalum Njanum Thammil, Crocodile Love Story, 1983, Ring Master, Life of Josutty and Mili. She came to fame through her portrayal of Aamina in Guppy. She later appeared on notable roles in Paulettante Veedu, Aakashamittayee, Mazhayathu and cameo appearances in Sunday Holiday, Mohabbathin Kunjabdulla and Anjaam Pathiraa. She made her Tamil debut through a supporting role in Rajavukku Check. She played the parallel lead role in Anaswara Rajan starer Vaanku.

Filmography
All films are in Malayalam language unless otherwise noted.

References

External links
 

Actresses in Malayalam cinema
Child actresses in Malayalam cinema
Living people
21st-century Indian child actresses
Indian film actresses
Actresses from Kerala
Actresses in Tamil cinema
Year of birth missing (living people)